Hagemeyer is a surname. Notable people with the surname include:

Alice Lougee Hagemeyer (born 1934), American librarian
Johan Hagemeyer (1884–1962), Dutch horticulturist, vegetarian, and photographer
Maria Hagemeyer (1896–1991), German judge